John Brough (1811–1865) was an American politician, who served as Governor of Ohio.

John Brough may also refer to:

John Brough, New Zealand actor, father of director Jonathan Brough
John Brough (academic) (1917–1984), Scottish scholar of Sanskrit
John Brough (English footballer) (born 1973), English footballer (Hereford United, Cheltenham Town)
John Brough (Scottish footballer) (born 1960), Scottish footballer (Heart of Midlothian, Partick Thistle)
John Cargill Brough (1834–1872), British science writer, lecturer, editor and librarian